SuperFight is a professional wrestling supercard event produced by Major League Wrestling (MLW). 

The first event was broadcast as a special live episode of Fusion that aired on February 2, 2019; the second live special in the show's history. The second event, Saturday Night SuperFight, was held later that year on November 2 as MLW's first-ever pay-per-view card. SuperFight has since been described as a "landmark, mega event" for the promotion.

Dates and venues

References

External links
Major League Wrestling official website

SuperFight
Recurring events established in 2019